De Lacy Academy (formerly Knottingley High School) is a  mixed secondary school located in Knottingley in the City of Wakefield, West Yorkshire, England.

Previously a community school administered by Wakefield Council, Knottingley High School converted to academy status in April 2012 and was renamed De Lacy Academy. The school is part of Delta Academies Trust, but continues to coordinate with Wakefield Council for admissions.

De Lacy Academy offers GCSEs and BTECs as programmes of study for pupils.

References

External links
South Leeds Academy official website

Secondary schools in the City of Wakefield
Academies in the City of Wakefield
Delta schools
Knottingley